Swindells Hall is an academic building on the University of Portland campus in Portland, Oregon, United States. The 41,000 square-foot building was built in 1999.

References

1999 establishments in Oregon
Buildings and structures completed in 1999
Buildings and structures in Portland, Oregon
University of Portland campus